The Shymkent Challenger is a professional tennis tournament played on clay courts. It is currently part of the Association of Tennis Professionals (ATP) Challenger Tour. It is held annually in Shymkent, Kazakhstan since 2017.

Andrej Martin won the singles tournament two times.

Past finals

Singles

Doubles

Shymkent
Sport in Shymkent
 
ATP Challenger Tour
Clay court tennis tournaments
Tennis tournaments in Kazakhstan
Recurring sporting events established in 2017